Christy Township is located in Lawrence County, Illinois. As of the 2010 census, its population was 3,774 and it contained 656 housing units.

Geography

Demographics

References

External links
City-data.com
Illinois State Archives

Townships in Lawrence County, Illinois
Townships in Illinois